James, Jamie,  Jim or Jimmy Porter may refer to:

Politics and diplomacy
James Porter (Australian politician) (born 1950), former member of the Australian House of Representatives
James Porter (diplomat) (1710–1776), British
James Porter (Jacobite), Vice-Chamberlain of King James II of England who followed him into exile
James Porter (New Brunswick politician) (1847–1926), farmer, miller and political figure in New Brunswick, Canada
James Porter (New York politician) (1787–1839), U.S. Representative from New York
James D. Porter (1828–1912), Governor of Tennessee
James E. Porter (1857–1946), mayor of Kansas City, Kansas
James Madison Porter (1793–1862), American cabinet secretary

Sport
James Porter (cricketer) (fl. 1844–1845), English cricketer
Jamie Porter (born 1993), English cricketer 
Jim Porter (born 1949), Australian rugby player
Jim Porter (Australian rules footballer) (1892–1936)
Jimmy Porter (football manager) (1901–1967), manager of Manchester United F.C. of Bury F.C.

Fiction
 James Porter, character in Disney's 2008 film College Road Trip
Jim Porter (Falling Skies), character in the TNT television series Falling Skies 
 Jimmy Porter, the lead character in John Osborne's 1956 play Look Back in Anger

Other
James Porter (Catholic priest) (1935–2005), defrocked American priest and child molester
James Porter (Master of Peterhouse, Cambridge) (1827–1900), British academic
James A. Porter (1905–1970), African American art historian, author of Modern Negro Art
James A. Porter (novelist) (1836–1897), American novelist
James Ezekiel Porter (1847–1876), American soldier in the Battle of the Little Bighorn
James Frederick Porter (1855–1919), Australian engineer and mine manager
James Herbert Porter (died 1973), English brewer and brewing executive
James Madison Porter III (1864–1928), American civil engineer
James W. Porter II (born 1949), elected president of the National Rifle Association in 2013
Jim Porter (giant) (1811–1859), American tavern keeper and coach driver
James I. Porter, literary theorist